Joan Baptista Pla i Agustí  (ca. 17201773) was a Spanish composer and oboist.

Pla was born in Catalonia, Spain, into a Catalan family of musicians. In the years after 1751, he worked in many of the principal cities of Europe including Padua, Stuttgart, Brussels, Paris and 
London along with his brother, Josep Pla i Agustí (1728-1762), a chamber musician. After Josep's death, Joan Baptista went to Lisbon as an oboist and bassoonist.  He is thought to have died in Paris.

The Pla brothers left hundreds of manuscripts including about 30 trio sonatas and some concertos for flute and strings. Another brother, Manuel Pla (ca. 1725-1766) was a violinist and harpsichordist at the court of Madrid.

Sources

Joan Baptista Pla, entry in the German Wikipedia

External links

1720 births
1773 deaths
18th-century classical composers
18th-century male musicians
Spanish Classical-period composers
Spanish male classical composers
Spanish oboists
Spanish classical bassoonists
Composers from Catalonia
Male oboists